Wilner is a German and Jewish surname meaning (in Yiddish) "from Wilna/Vilne". Alternative form: Vilensky, Wilenski.
Notable people with the surname include:
 Alan M. Wilner (born 1937), American jurist
 Eleanor Wilner (born 1937), American poet and editor
Izrael Chaim Wilner (1917 - 1943), Jewish resistance fighter and participant in the Warsaw Ghetto Uprising.
 Max Wilner, (1895-1956) Yiddish Actor
 Max R. Wilner, (1881-??), David Kessler's step-son. Involved in early Yiddish Theatre 
 Meir Wilner (1918-2003), leader of Israeli communists until the end of 1980s
 Robert F. Wilner (1889-1960), Suffragan Bishop of the Philippine Islands
 Sheri Wilner (born 1969) American playwright
 Thomas Wilner (born 1944),  partner of Shearman & Sterling's International Trade and Global Relations Practice
 Sidney (Sid) Wilner (born 1929) American Actor, Yiddish Theatre, Actor Lawrence Welk Theatre, Actor Hollywood Film, Television, Theatre